Xiangyang Subdistrict is a subdistrict in Taonan, Jilin, China. , it has three residential communities and eight villages under its administration.

See also 
 List of township-level divisions of Jilin

References 

Township-level divisions of Jilin
Taonan